Łukasz Kubot and Marcelo Melo were the defending champions, but Melo could not participate due to injury and Kubot chose to compete in Auckland instead.

Jamie Murray and Bruno Soares won the title, defeating Juan Sebastián Cabal and Robert Farah in the final, 6–4, 6–3.

Seeds

Draw

Draw

References
Main Draw

Men's Doubles